Zsa Zsa (also Zsazsa) is a given name originated as the baby pet name of Zsa Zsa Gabor (1917–2016), Hungarian-American actress and socialite.

Notable people, characters, and animals with the name include:

People
 Zsa Zsa Gabor (1917–2016), Hungarian-American actress and socialite
 Zsa Zsa Padilla (born 1964), Filipino singer and actress
 Ms Zsa Zsa Poltergeist, the stage name of British musician Andy Billups, member of the Hamsters
 Zsa Zsa Riordan (born 1990), Polish-American figure skater
 Zsa Zsa Speck (fl. 1989), American keyboardist
 Zsa Zsa (singer) (born 1994), Croatian singer

Fictional characters
 Zsa Zsa Carter, a character from the British soap opera EastEnders
 Zsazsa Zaturnnah, a character in Filipino comic books
 Zsazsa, a cat puppet in the children's TV series Hector's House
 Zsa Zsa Harper-Jenkinson, a character from the British soap opera Casualty
 Zsa Zsa, a teddy bear, belongs to Nori from Hey Duggee a British children’s TV series
 Zsa Zsa, a recurring villain in SuperKitties

Animals
 Zsa Zsa, the pet rabbit of US President John F. Kennedy

See also
 ZSA (disambiguation)

Hungarian feminine given names